Heteropterna is a genus of predatory fungus gnats in the family Keroplatidae. There are at least 20 described species in Heteropterna.

Species
These 25 species belong to the genus Heteropterna:

H. abdominalis Lane, 1948 c g
H. affinis Skuse, 1890 c g
H. annulipes (Colless, 1966) c g
H. balachowskyi Matile, 1970 c g
H. caraibeana Matile, 1982 c g
H. chazeaui Matile, 1988 c g
H. cressoni (Fisher, 1941) i c g
H. fenestralis Matile, 1990 c g
H. flavovittata Matile, 1990 c g
H. gagnei Matile, 1990 c g
H. ghesquierei Tollet, 1955 c g
H. imperfecta Matile, 1982 c g
H. interrupta Matile, 1990 c g
H. laterociliata Matile, 1990 c g
H. macleayi Skuse, 1888 c g
H. major Curran, 1928 c g
H. montana Matile, 1990 c g
H. orozi Papp, 2006 c g
H. perdistincta Matile, 1990 c g
H. septemtrionalis Okada, 1938 g
H. tetraleuca Edwards, 1940 c g
H. thaii Papp, 2006 c g
H. triangularis Matile, 1990 c g
H. trileuca Edwards, 1940 c g
H. vicina Matile, 1990 c g

Data sources: i = ITIS, c = Catalogue of Life, g = GBIF, b = Bugguide.net

References

Further reading

External links

 

Keroplatidae
Articles created by Qbugbot
Sciaroidea genera